Paul Rose is an American politician and businessman who is a Republican member of the Tennessee Senate. He has represented District 32, which includes Tipton County and part of Shelby County, since March 12, 2019.

Background 
Rose joined his family's company, Rose Construction, in 1974 and later went on to become president of the company.

2019 elections

Current legislative committees

Civic memberships

References 

Republican Party Tennessee state senators
Year of birth missing (living people)
Living people
21st-century American politicians